Ramón Nazareno Miérez (born 13 May 1997) is an Argentine professional footballer who plays as a forward for Croatian First Football League club NK Osijek.

Career
On 14 June 2019, Miérez signed for Deportivo Alavés in Spain. On 5 August, however, he was loaned to Segunda División side CD Tenerife for one year.

On 27 August 2020, Miérez went to NK Osijek on loan. Miérez signed a permanent deal with Osijek following the successful loan.

Career statistics

Club

References

External links
 
 
 

1997 births
Living people
People from Resistencia, Chaco
Argentine footballers
Association football forwards
Argentine Primera División players
Club Atlético Tigre footballers
Croatian Football League players
NK Istra 1961 players
NK Osijek players
Segunda División players
Deportivo Alavés players
CD Tenerife players
Argentine expatriate footballers
Argentine expatriate sportspeople in Croatia
Argentine expatriate sportspeople in Spain
Expatriate footballers in Croatia
Expatriate footballers in Spain
Sportspeople from Chaco Province